The epithet tokkie is used in the Netherlands as a pejorative noun for lower-class people who often are seen as likely to engage in anti-social behaviour, similar to the English chav, the Scottish ned, the South African zef and the Australian bogan.

The term is derived from the surname Tokkie and came into general use when the Dutch family Tokkie (who bear some resemblance to the fictional Flodder family from the eponymous Dutch comedy film of the 1980s) gained notoriety when they were portrayed on national television in 2004 and 2005. Of this family  only the mother (Hanna Tokkie) bears the surname Tokkie. The other family members bear the surname Ruijmgaart (after the father, Gerrie Ruijmgaart).

The word has been included in the authoritative Van Dale dictionary.

References

2000s slang
Class-related slurs
Dutch words and phrases
Social class subcultures
Stereotypes of the working class
Working class in Europe